John Kent may refer to:

Politicians
John Kent (died 1630) (1559–1630), MP for Devizes
John Kent (died 1669) (c. 1612–1669), English politician, MP for Devizes
John Kent (died 1413), MP for Reading
John Kent (MP for Bedford), MP for Bedford
John Kent (Newfoundland politician) (1805–1872), premier of Newfoundland

Others
John A. Kent (1914–1985), Canadian fighter ace in World War II
John Kent (cartoonist) (1937–2003), New Zealand cartoonist
John Rodolphus Kent (died 1837), Royal Navy officer and trader in New Zealand
John Kent (hymnist) (1766–1843) English Calvinist Baptist hymn writer
John Kent (police officer) (1795–1886) The first Black British police officer

See also
Jack Kent (disambiguation)
Jonathan Kent (disambiguation)
Kent (surname)